Pavel Nikolaevich Medvedev (in Saint Petersburg – 17 July 1938 in Leningrad) was a Russian literary scholar. He was a professor, social activist, and friend of Mikhail Bakhtin, as well as of Boris Pasternak and Fyodor Sologub. Medvedev held several government posts in education and publishing after the 1917 revolution, publishing a great deal of his own writing on literary, sociological, and linguistic issues. Medvedev was arrested during the 1930s period of purges under the rule of Joseph Stalin, and  "disappeared" shortly after his arrest. He was shot on 17 July 1938.

One of his works, The Formal Method in Literary Scholarship, was believed to be written by his "co-thinker" Bakhtin, using his name to escape censorship. This belief was raised during the 1970s in Russia but developed fully in Clark and Holquist's English biography of Bakhtin of 1984. Now, it is mostly believed that the work was written by Medvedev although influenced by Bakhtin's ideas.

See also
Mikhail Bakhtin
Russian Formalism

References

Bibliography
 Yury P. Medvedev, Daria A. Medvedeva, Pavel Medvedev Gallery of Russian Thinkers... selected Dmitry Olshansky. Translation by David Shepherd.
 The Bakhtin Circle //Internet Encyclopedia of Philosophy
 Brandist, Craig, The Bakhtin Circle: Philosophy, Culture and Politics London, Sterling, Virginia: Pluto Press, 2002.
 Brandist, Craig, Shepherd, David, and Tihanov, Galin. The Bakhtin Circle: a timeline. In Brandist, Shepherd and Tihanov (eds), The Bakhtin Circle. In the Master’s Absence. Manchester and New York: Manchester University Press, 2004. , pp. 251–275.
 Medvedev, Iu.P., and Medvedeva, D.A. The scholarly legacy of Pavel Medvedev in the light of his dialogue with Bakhtin. In Craig Brandist, David Shepherd and Galin Tihanov (eds), The Bakhtin Circle: In the Master’s Absence. Manchester and New York: Manchester University Press, 2004. , pp. 24–43.
Medvedev, Iu.P., An Encounter that was 'Intended to be' // Dialogism (An International  Journal of Bakhtin Studies). London – N.Y. 2002. Nos. 5&6, pp. 10–20.

1892 births
1938 deaths
Writers from Saint Petersburg
20th-century Russian male writers
20th-century philologists
Soviet literary historians
Soviet male writers
Russian philologists
Russian formalism
Academic staff of Herzen University